Tobias-Mbunjiro Knost (born 8 May 2000) is a German professional footballer who plays as a defender for  club SC Verl.

Club career
Born in Berlin, Knost played youth football for Tennis Borussia Berlin before joining Hamburger SV in 2014. He signed a professional contract with the club in November 2017, and made his first-team debut for the club on 18 August 2018 in a 5–3 DFB-Pokal win over TuS Erndtebrück. He left the club in summer 2021, having failed to make another first-team appearance, whilst he did play for the reserve side 13 times during his spell at the club.

On 17 June 2021, it was announced that Knost had signed for 3. Liga club 1. FC Magdeburg, with the club not disclosing details on the contract.

On 6 June 2022, Knost moved to SC Verl.

International career
Knost made 2 appearances for Germany at under-18 level in 2017.

References

External links

2000 births
Living people
German footballers
Germany youth international footballers
Footballers from Berlin
Association football defenders
Tennis Borussia Berlin players
Hamburger SV II players
1. FC Magdeburg players
SC Verl players
3. Liga players
Regionalliga players